United States v. La Vengeance, 3 U.S. (3 Dall.) 297 (1796), was a 1796 decision of the United States Supreme Court which found that a proceeding by the United States to forfeit a vessel is a cause of admiralty and maritime jurisdiction.  Specifically, "[a]n injunction to enforce the forfeiture of a vessel, for an illegal exportation of arms and ammunition, is a civil cause of admiralty and maritime jurisdiction. The courts will take judicial notice of a geographical fact."

References

External links
 

United States Supreme Court cases
United States Supreme Court cases of the Ellsworth Court
United States admiralty case law
1796 in United States case law